Maik Heydeck (born 8 September 1965 in Angermünde) is an East German amateur boxer who competed at the super heavyweight division, winning a bronze medal at the 1989 World Championships in Moscow. He represented the SC Dynamo Berlin / Sportvereinigung (SV) Dynamo.

References

External links

1965 births
Living people
German police officers
Light-heavyweight boxers
German male boxers
Olympic boxers of East Germany
Boxers at the 1988 Summer Olympics
People from Angermünde
AIBA World Boxing Championships medalists
Sportspeople from Brandenburg